Ze Hkaung (born 7 September 1981) is a Burmese politician who currently serves as an Amyotha Hluttaw MP for Kachin State No. 3 constituency. He is a member of the National League for Democracy.

Early life and education
Ze Hkaung was born on 7 September 1981 in Waingmaw Township, Kachin State, Myanmar. He is an ethnic Lhaovo. He graduated with B.Sc (Botany) from Myitkyina University. In 2012, he became NLD member. From 2012 to 2015, he had served township campaign.

Political career
He is a member of the National League for Democracy. In the 2015 Myanmar general election, he was elected as an Amyotha Hluttaw MP, winning a majority of 12353 votes and elected representative from Kachin State No. 3 parliamentary constituency. He worked as chairman of automobile association.

References

National League for Democracy politicians
1981 births
Living people
People from Kachin State
Burmese people of Kachin descent
21st-century Burmese politicians
Members of the House of Nationalities